A total lunar eclipse will take place on September 7, 2044. It will be the first total eclipse in Lunar Saros 138.

Visibility

Related lunar eclipses

Lunar year series

Metonic cycles (19 years)

Tritos series 
 Preceded: Lunar eclipse of October 8, 2033

 Followed: Lunar eclipse of August 7, 2055

Tzolkinex 
 Preceded: Lunar eclipse of July 27, 2037

 Followed: Lunar eclipse of October 19, 2051

Half-Saros cycle
A lunar eclipse will be preceded and followed by solar eclipses by 9 years and 5.5 days (a half saros). This lunar eclipse is related to two total solar eclipses of Solar Saros 145.

Eclipse season 
This is the second eclipse this season. 

First eclipse in this season: Solar eclipse of August 23, 2044

See also
List of lunar eclipses and List of 21st-century lunar eclipses

References

External links

2044-09
2044-09
2044 in science